Hamada Mohamed (born 22 October 1992), also known as Mohamed Ahmed Hamada, is an Egyptian middle-distance runner. He represented Egypt at the 2012 Summer Olympics. Mohamed holds multiple national track records for Egypt.

Running career
One of Mohamed's first international appearances was at the 2010 IAAF World Cross Country Championships, where he finished the Junior men's race in 28:25 (min:sec), finishing in 113th of 118 finishers. Hamada would later produce much livelier results on the track.

At the 2011 Arab Athletics Championships, Mohamed finished second in the 1500 metres race, recording a time of 3:59.15. Later that same year, at the 2011 Pan Arab Games, Mohamed ran the 800 metres, finishing the finals round in fifth place of six finishers, in a time of 1:48.08.

Due to his promising results even though he was only a teenager, Mohamed was selected by Egypt to compete at the 2012 Summer Olympics.  At the 2012 Summer Olympics, he ran in the men's 800 metres where he finished 8th in his semi-finals heat with a time of 1:48:18.

Mohamed then ran in the first heat of the men's 800 metres at the 2013 World Championships in Athletics, barely missing qualification to the next round, although he ran a great race against the likes of Marcin Lewandowski and Giordano Benedetti.

References

Living people
1992 births
Egyptian male middle-distance runners
Olympic athletes of Egypt
Athletes (track and field) at the 2012 Summer Olympics
Athletes (track and field) at the 2016 Summer Olympics
People from Qena
World Athletics Championships athletes for Egypt
Athletes (track and field) at the 2018 Mediterranean Games
Athletes (track and field) at the 2019 African Games
African Games competitors for Egypt
Mediterranean Games competitors for Egypt
21st-century Egyptian people